Ben John Franks (born 27 March 1984) is a New Zealand rugby union coach and former player. He played as a prop. He is one of only 21 players who have won the Rugby World Cup on multiple occasions.

Ben Franks along with younger brother Owen run their own gym in Christchurch, New Zealand called "Franks Brothers Gym". Franks is extremely strong, with video footage showing him squatting 300 kg.

Club career

Provincial
Franks made his provincial debut for Canterbury against Otago in 2005. He has since played for both Canterbury and the Tasman Mako in the Air New Zealand Cup, securing 42 caps (16 for Canterbury, 26 for Tasman).

Super Rugby

Ben is the older brother of Owen also an All Black prop, and both represent the Linwood Rugby club in Christchurch. Both brothers were selected for the 2010 All Blacks squad to face Ireland and Wales in the home series thus being the first brothers to represent New Zealand since Robin and Zinzan Brooke.

Premiership Rugby
On 20 January 2015, it was confirmed Franks would join Premiership Rugby side London Irish after the 2015 Rugby World Cup. After three seasons with London Irish, it was confirmed that Franks would link up with Northampton Saints for the 2018/19 season. He retired from playing in 2020, turning to coaching instead.

International career
On 26 October 2008, Franks was selected for the All Blacks end of year tour squad to travel to Hong Kong, England, Ireland, Scotland and Wales. He became Aranui High School's first ever All Black when he played against Munster at Thomond Park.

He started the first match of the Pacific Nations Cup against Samoa in June 2009 with a close victory, winning 17–16. He then played the final match of the tournament against Tonga, but did not score a point even though New Zealand won 47–25.

Franks played his first match of 2010 in a test match at Yarrow Stadium against Ireland. The All Black's won by a triumphant 66–28 and Franks got his first ever try for the All Blacks. He also played a week later in the All Black's victory over Wales in Dunedin.

His test performance won him a spot in the All Black's line up to face South Africa in the first match of the 2010 Tri-Nations tournament. He played again against South Africa a week later and twice against Australia in the following weeks. He played the penultimate match against South Africa but was left out of the team for the final match against Australia and his place taken by his brother Owen.

He started off 2011 with a friendly against Fiji followed by wins over South Africa and Australia in the 2011 Tri-Nations tournament. He played in the penultimate loss to South Africa and was subsequently replaced by brother Owen once again.

Franks came on as a sub during the opening match of the 2011 Rugby World Cup. He was an unused replacement as New Zealand beat France in the final

Franks was later named in the 31-man All Black squad to attend the 2015 Rugby World Cup, playing in the knockout stages including the final where New Zealand defeated Australia 34–17.

Coaching career
Following his 2020 retirement, Franks was appointed scrum coach at URC side Scarlets.

References

External links 

1984 births
New Zealand international rugby union players
Crusaders (rugby union) players
Canterbury rugby union players
People educated at Christchurch Boys' High School
Living people
New Zealand rugby union players
Rugby union props
Australian emigrants to New Zealand
Rugby union players from Motueka
Hurricanes (rugby union) players
Tasman rugby union players
Hawke's Bay rugby union players
People educated at Aranui High School
Northampton Saints players
London Irish players
Rugby union players from Melbourne